Refuge Robert Blanc is a refuge in the Alps at an altitude of 2,750 m, located on the route of the Tour du Mont Blanc.

External links
Official website

Mountain huts in the Alps
Mountain huts in France